Austin Johnson may refer to:

 Austin Johnson (defensive lineman) (born 1994), American football player
 Austin Johnson (fullback) (born 1989), American football player